Willi Pürstl (born 10 January 1955) is an Austrian former ski jumper who competed from 1973 to 1981. He won the overall Four Hills Tournament in 1974–75. 

In 1988 Pürstl immigrated to Canada, where he had a long career as a ski jumping coach, journalist, TV presenter, producer, editor and cameraman.

References

1955 births
Austrian male ski jumpers
Living people
People from Murau District
Sportspeople from Styria
20th-century Austrian people